The Aquabus, also known as Aquabus Ferries Ltd., is a privately owned and operated ferry service that provides commuter and sightseeing services to locations all along False Creek of central Vancouver, British Columbia, Canada. The Aquabus started service in 1986.

History
The beginning of ferry service throughout False Creek occurred in the summer of 1979 when Brian and Laura Beesley began operating a tour and water taxi service around Granville Island and False Creek. The Aquabus Ferry Company was formed in 1986 by Jeff Pratt, the son of George Pratt who was a former partner at competitor Granville Island Ferries division False Creek Ferries.  It has since grown along with the population surrounding False Creek. Four Benford designed ferries were in operation by Expo 86 and the additional three plus a bicycle ferry, Cyquabus I, were in service by 1995. The heritage ferry, the Rainbow Hunter, was built in 1950. As Vancouver grew, Aquabus incorporated two more versatile and spacious bicycle ferries, the Cyquabus II and the Cyquabus III, in 2003 and 2006. In mid-2008, one of the Benford ferries was converted to a fully electric propulsion system and was used as a test platform for Aquabus' exploration of alternative energy. In the second quarter of 2010, the Aquabus acquired two new bicycle ferries, Cyquabus IV and Cyquabus V, and sold the heritage Rainbow Hunter.

The fleet
The Aquabus Ferry Company fleet is currently composed of fourteen vessels, divided into two classes:

 Seven traditional Aquabus vessels, designed specifically for this purpose by naval architect Jay Benford.  These vessels run year round with a carrying capacity of twelve, plus one skipper. In 2008, Aquabus IV was converted to use an electric motor.
 Seven Cyquabus ferries, designed to accommodate those with bicycles, strollers, and wheelchairs, as well as regular passengers. The Cyquabus I was designed and assembled in 1995 by owner Jeff Pratt in his backyard from pieces made to his specifications by Aggressive Tube Bending of Burnaby, British Columbia. Cyquabus I was decommissioned in the fourth quarter of 2010 following 15 years of service on False Creek as the Aquabus' first bicycle ferry.

Stop list
The Aquabus Ferry Company makes scheduled stops at the following locations:

 Hornby Street's south foot
 Granville Island, next to the Arts Club Theatre
 David Lam Park at Homer Street
 Stamp's Landing near Mahony’s Tavern False Creek restaurant
 Spyglass Place near Olympic Village beneath the Cambie Street Bridge on the south shore
 Yaletown at the foot of Davie Street
 Plaza of Nations
 Science World, across from the SkyTrain's Main Street–Science World station

See also
 False Creek Ferries - operates passenger ferries from Granville Island
 English Bay Launch - operates water taxis from Granville Island

References

External links

Transport in Greater Vancouver
Tourism in Vancouver
Ferries of British Columbia